The Bernède quartet  was a French string quartet established in  1963 in Paris and disestablished in 1991.

Members

First violin 
 Jean-Claude Bernède (1935–1991)

Second violin 
 Jacques Prat (1963–1967) 
 Gérard Montmayeur (1967–1970)
 Marcel Charpentier (1970–)

Viola 
 Bruno Pasquier (1963–1967)
 Guy Chêne (1967–1970)
 Michel Laléouse (1970–)
 Serge Collot (1923–2015)

Cello 
 Paul Boufil (1963-1976)
 Jean-Claude Ribéra (1976-1979)
 Pierre Penassou (1925–2000)

Premieres 
 Quartet nº 3 by Claude Ballif
 Quatuor nº 2 by Michel Philippot
 Works by Xenakis

References

External links 
 Quatuor Bernède on data.bnf.fr
 Le Quatuor Bernède on Discogs
 Quatuor Bernède on Rate your music
 Fauré Piano Quartet No1 in C minor Op.15 - Samson François and quatuor Bernède on YouTube

Bernede
Organizations disestablished in 1991